The list of longest-serving ministers in Indonesia is a list of the longest serving ministers in the cabinets of Indonesia, which have served ten years or longer, sorted by length.

All ministers who had served between the Third Development Cabinet until the Seventh Development Cabinet were mandatorily seated by Suharto as members of the advisory council of the Golkar party. Bold minister name means the minister is currently serving.

Notes

References

Longest-serving
Indonesia